The Constitutional history of the People's Republic of China describes the evolution of its Constitutional system. The first Constitution of the People's Republic of China was promulgated in 1954. After two intervening versions enacted in 1975 and 1978, the current Constitution was promulgated in 1982. There were significant differences between each of these versions, and the 1982 Constitution has subsequently been amended several times. In addition, changing Constitutional conventions have led to significant changes in the structure of the Chinese government in the absence of changes in the text of the Constitution.

Background and precedents 
Dynastic China adopted a constitutional system oscillating between a feudal distribution of power and a centralistic autocracy. The idea of a constitutional monarchy, and a written constitution, became influential towards the end of the 19th century, inspired immediately in large parts by the precedent of the Meiji Constitution in Japan. The first attempt towards constitutionalism was during the Hundred Days' Reform (1898), but a coup by conservative monarchists loyal to Empress Dowager Cixi ended this effort. The same faction, however, eventually adopted a policy of transitioning towards constitutionalism. However, the first constitutional document was only published in 1908, and the first constitutional document with legal force (the "Nineteen Covenants") was not implemented until 1911, after the eruption of the Xinhai Revolution, which led to the demise of the Qing empire the next year.

The Republic of China established in 1912 was governed by a series of constitutional documents. The "Provisional Covenants" of 1912 established a parliamentary republic, but a series of written and unwritten changes to the constitution in the ensuing years oscillated between semi-presidential, presidential and even (briefly) monarchical systems of government, until the Kuomintang took power in 1928. Both the provisional covenants and later constitutional documents authored by the Kuomintang, purported to reflect Sun Yat-sen's Three Principles of the People and Western norms. The unrecognized proto-state of the Soviet-backed Chinese Soviet Republic adopted its constitution in 1931.

The first formal Constitution was enacted in 1946, when the Kuomintang-controlled government hastily declared an end to the "political tutelage" stage of Sun Yat-sen's three-stage theory of constitutional government amidst internal and external pressures. The Republic of China government progressively lost control of mainland China in the late 1940s to early 1950s, but the Constitution of the Republic of China, with amendments, is still the organic law of the government in Taiwan.

Common Program (1949)
In 1949, the Chinese Civil War was turning decisively in favour of the Chinese Communist Party. In June, the Communist Party organised a "Chinese People's Political Consultative Conference" (CPPCC) to prepare for the establishment of a "New Democracy" regime to replace the Kuomintang-dominated Republic of China government.

The first meeting of the CPPCC opened on 21 September 1949, and was attended by the Communist Party along with eight aligned parties. The first CPPCC served in effect as a Constitutional Convention. The meeting approved the Common Program, which was effectively an interim Constitution, specifying the structure of the new government, and determining the name and symbols of the new state. It also elected leaders of the new central government, including Mao Zedong as Chairman of the Central People's Government. After the end of the conference, the People's Republic of China was proclaimed on 1 October 1949.

The People's Republic of China functioned for the next five years under the Common Program, with a degree of democracy and inclusion that has never been seen again in Chinese government to the present day. Among the provisions of the Common Program were those guaranteeing protection of private property (Article 3), "uniting" the bourgeoisie (Article 13), and assisting private enterprise (Article 30). The first People's Government, elected in 1949, included a significant number of representatives from parties other than the Communist Party.

1954 Constitution

In accordance with the Common Program, preparations soon began for convening the first National People's Congress and the drafting of the first permanent Constitution of the People's Republic of China. On 24 December 1952, a resolution was moved by Premier Zhou Enlai on behalf of the Chinese Communist Party at the 43rd meeting of the first CPPCC Standing Committee to draft the new, permanent, Constitution. The resolution was passed, and on 13 January 1953, the Central People's Government appointed a thirty-person drafting committee led by Mao Zedong.

The drafting process was dominated by the Communist Party, and was almost exclusively restricted to the Politburo. In March 1954, the draft Constitution was passed to the CPPCC and discussed in a national education campaign in the spring and summer of 1954. On 20 September 1954, exactly five years after the passage of the Common Program, the first meeting of the first National People's Congress unanimously approved the new Constitution. This version has subsequently been called the "1954 Constitution".

The 1954 Constitution included a preamble and 108 articles organised into four chapters. It specified a government structure remarkably similar to the current system. Chapter Two of the 1954 Constitution set up a system of government composed of six structural parts. The highest organ of government was the legislature, the National People's Congress. The executive was composed of the President and the State Council. Sub-national government was to be composed of people's congresses and people's committees of various levels. Autonomous ethnic areas would decide on their forms of government according to the wishes of the "majority of the people" in these areas. Finally, a hierarchy of courts headed by the Supreme People's Court and the Supreme People's Procuratorate (which would investigate crimes by the government) formed the judicial system.

Chapter Three, Fundamental Rights and Duties of Citizens, guaranteed a relatively comprehensive set of human rights, but also imposed the duty to pay taxes, undertake national service, and to obey the law.

Like the subsequent versions of the Constitution, the 1954 Constitution was not entrenched. It could be amended by the National People's Congress (Article 27(1)) by a special two-thirds majority (Article 29) without recourse to a referendum or other such mechanism.

The 1954 Constitution was intended to be a transitional constitution, to be revised after China developed into a socialist economy.

1975 Constitution

However, the Chinese government functioned more or less as envisaged for only a short time. In 1957, the Anti-Rightist Movement marked the beginning of a series of political movements and purges during which the Constitution's protections against Party interference in the judiciary largely failed to be respected. These culminated in the Cultural Revolution (1966-1976), a period in which the normal operation of government virtually ceased. In 1966, President Liu Shaoqi was political denounced, and from 1967 was placed under house arrest. After suffering two years of persecution, Liu died, unreported, in 1969, and the position of President was left unfilled. During this period, most government bodies around the country ceased operation; various levels of people's governments were replaced by Revolutionary Committees. Instead of (formally) by election, power passed via public denunciations and, in many cases, violent clashes.

In 1975, Mao Zedong and his supporters sought to formalise their power through the promulgation of a new Constitution. Under the 1975 Constitution, the office of the President (officially translated as "Chairman" during this period) was abolished, leaving Mao, as the Chairman of the Communist Party, as the sole power centre. Formal duties of the President as Head of State were to be performed by the Chairman of the National People's Congress (who was, at the time, Zhu De). The replacement of local government by Revolutionary Committees was also formalised. The Constitution was shorted to 30 articles, and the Fundamental Rights and Duties of Citizens was greatly shortened. Guarantees removed included the rights to property and privacy, freedom from political discrimination, freedom of movement, speech, and artistic freedom, among other human rights. Concurrently, the duty to pay taxes was also removed. The 1975 Constitution also saw a significant shift in tone compared to the 1954 Constitution, and saw the insertion of a significant number of ideological sloganeering provisions, including the claim that the nation was guided by "Marxism-Leninism-Mao Zedong Thought".

1978 Constitution

Mao died in 1976, and the Gang of Four who had dominated Chinese politics were driven out of power by October 1976. The 1978 Constitution was promulgated in March 1978 under the chairmanship of Hua Guofeng. It contained 60 sections organised into four Chapters. In many ways, the 1978 Constitution was a compromise between the interim leadership's desire to consolidate power using Mao's moral authority, while responding to the popular desire to reverse the Leftists extremes of the previous period. On the one hand, the new Constitution in many places maintained the ideological tone of the 1975 Constitution, such as in Article 16 ("State officials must diligently study Marxism, Leninism, and Mao Zedong Thought, serve the people whole-heartedly ...") and Article 19 ("The fundamental role of the Armed Forces is: [...] defending against destabilisation and invasion from Socio-Imperialism, Imperialism, and their running dogs"). At the same time, the need for "Socialist democracy" was emphasised (Article 3), and the 1954 system of government was largely restored, including its significant checks on executive power.

1982 Constitution 

The 1978 Constitution was again short-lived. In December 1978, the third plenary meeting of the 11th Communist Party Central Committee began a series of reviews and reforms that confirmed Deng Xiaoping as the new paramount leader of China, with reform-minded leaders supported by Deng filling the top echelon of government. As part of the Deng faction's political reform agenda, a fourth Constitution was promulgated on 4 December 1982. The 1982 Constitution was born in a political environment where the past, including Mao's "errors" and almost all of the Communist Party's policies from 1949, were relatively objectively re-examined, and the country's future, including the pursuit of market economic reforms, was being openly debated. As a result, the 1982 Constitution returned the government structure to broadly that set up in 1954, with the Presidency restored. The Fundamental Rights and Duties of Citizens were greatly expanded, and elevated to Chapter Two, ahead of the provisions for the structure of the government. The 1982 Constitution was subsequently amended in 1988, 1993, 1999, 2004 and 2018, generally modifying the Constitution in accordance with economic and political reforms over that period. The current compilation dates from 11 March 2018.

The system of government set up under the 1982 Constitution has undergone some changes, largely due to the evolution of Constitutional conventions rather than textual amendments. The most significant of these occurred in 1989. As drafted, the 1982 Constitution contemplated that the power of the state would be distributed amongst the General Secretary of the Chinese Communist Party, the Premier of the State Council, and the Chairman of the Central Military Commission. The President, as nominal head of state, would be a symbolic role with little substantive power. Such was the arrangement until 1989. During the 1989 Tiananmen Square Protests, the Chinese leader, Deng Xiaoping, also the Chairman of Central Military Commission, used his formal powers under the Constitution to deploy troops to Beijing in support of the state of emergency declared by the Premier Li Peng, and colluded in the subsequent violent crackdown in Beijing, against the wishes of Zhao Ziyang, the General Secretary of the Communist Party. In a reaction against the conflict between the independent power centres, at the expiration of Deng's term, the new paramount leader, Jiang Zemin, became General Secretary of the Chinese Communist Party, and later took on the position of the Chairman of the Central Military Commission as well. In this way, the centres of power were unified. This convention has continued to this day.

The Constitution was amended on 11 March 2018. It includes an assortment of revisions that further enforce the Communist Party's control and supremacy, and removing term limits for both the President and Vice President, enabling Xi Jinping to remain president indefinitely.

See also 
 Constitution of the People's Republic of China
 History of the People's Republic of China

References 

Constitution of China
Legal history of China
China, People's Republic of